Green Island Lighthouse may refer to:

 Green Island Lighthouse (Hong Kong), one of China's lighthouses
 Green Island Lighthouse (British Columbia), in Prince Rupert, British Columbia, Canada, one of British Columbia's lighthouses